Qudrat Ali  (born 11 September 1969) (Urdu:قدرت علی) is a Pakistani mountaineer. He is also the co-founder and instructor in Shimshal Mountaineering School, and is a member of the Alpine Club.

Early life
Qudrat Ali was born in Shimshal village, Hunza–Nagar District of Gilgit-Baltistan, Pakistan. He experienced childhood in the Shimshal valley and spent his initial years moving in the Alps and became endlessly in love with the mountains.

Mountain climbing career
Qudrat Ali's mountain climbing career started in 1991 when he accompanied Paul Hudson to a peak in Shimshal, he learned the techniques of mountain climbing from him. He successfully climbed four 8000ers (Broad Peak (1999), Gasherbrum I(2004) and II(2000) and the Nanga Parbat(2001)) out of five in Pakistan. In later years he would join accomplished mountaineer Ralf Dujmovits and alpinist Simone Moro to climb different peaks in Pakistan. In 2001 he made a successful ascent of Nanga Parbat without supplemental oxygen, with Ralf Dujmovits, and Qudrat Ali was the main climber to rise every one of the fourteen crests. He has been part of several challenging expeditions including winter attempts of broad peak twice, in 2008 and 2009.

List of mountains climbed

Awards
 2004 - Shield awarded by Government of Pakistan for his summit of Nanga Parbat.
 2005 - Best performance in climbing at Mountain Festival, Islamabad.

Shimshal Mountaineering School
Established formally in 2009 with the support of Simone Moro, Shimshal Mountaineering School is a pioneer in professional mountaineering training institute in Pakistan. A dream project of Qudrat Ali and Shaheen Baig, Shimshal Mountaineering School strives to promote healthy sports and excellence in professional mountaineering through extensive hands-on mountaineering training programs. Led by a team of renowned mountaineering instructors, with treasure of mountaineering experience, Shimshal Mountaineering School has a very customized and tailor-made mountaineering courses to suit the needs of beginners as well as advanced level mountaineers. Located at the heart of Shimshal. Shimshal Mountaineering School is the first ever mountaineering institute in Pakistan which initiated an exclusive mountaineering program for women since its inception.

Project Climb4Peace
Qudrat Ali is undertaking his latest expedition Climb4Peace a five years project with his climbing partner Samiya Rafiq.

See also 

 Meherban Karim
 Shaheen Baig

References

External links
Facebook
Shimshal Mountaineering School Facebook Page

Living people
1969 births
People from Hunza-Nagar District
Pakistani mountain climbers
Organization founders